Chekurovka is a rural locality (a selo), in Bulunsky National (Evenk) Rural Okrug of Bulunsky District in the Sakha Republic, Russia, located  Kyusyur, the administrative centre of the rural okrug and  from Tiksi, the administrative center of the district. Its population as of the 2010 Census was 0, the same as recorded during the 2002 Census.

Geography

History
Prior to the dissolution of the village in 1970, Chekurovka was the centre of the Victory collective farm consisting of five reindeer herds, ten hunting areas and three fishing areas capable of producing up to one hundred tons of fish. During its height, approximately one hundred families lived in the village supported by a primary school, club, shop, bakery and medical centre. In 1970, the population was forcibly moved and the village closed whilst nearby an underground nuclear explosion was carried out and a search for oil and gas was made. In 1992, families of former residents decided to resettle the site of the former village, with the site now consisting of two houses, a power plant and storage facilities employing 65 people.

References

Notes

Sources
Official website of the Sakha Republic. Registry of the Administrative-Territorial Divisions of the Sakha Republic. Bulunsky District. 

Rural localities in Bulunsky District
Populated places on the Lena River